Historical Vaikundar (1809–1851) refers to the life and teachings of Ayya Vaikundar, as known in Akilathirattu Ammanai, being reconstructed from a historical perspective with reference to various historical sources in contrast to the mythological Akilamic views. Though few events referred to in the mythology have yet to be validated historically, many key events mentioned in Akilam were acknowledged  by  other contemporary  sources.

Ayya Vaikundar was the first to succeed as a social reformer in launching political struggle, social renaissance as well as religious reformation in the country. Vaikundar was the pioneer of the social revolutionaries of south India and Kerala. Research scholars regard Vaikundar as a teacher, healer and also a miracle worker. He was also said to be the forerunner of all social reformers of India.  He was in the forefront of movements for Human Rights and Social Equality. His teachings also effected many social changes in southern India, resulting in the emergence of a series of social and self-respect movements such as Upper cloth agitation, Temple entry agitation and other movements including those of Narayana Guru, Chattampi Swamikal, Vallalar and Ayyankali.

Early life

The year as well as the exact date of birth of Vaikundar is a matter of conflict.  Various historians place the year of birth as 1809 C.E while as few other sources placed his birth in 1808 C.E. Akilam did not mention any direct reference to the date. But by the time he was taken to Tiruchendur for being cured after he fall sick he was at his 24, for which the exact date is mentioned in Akilam as 20th Masi 1008 M.E which falls on 4 March 1833. The date of birth too is subject to greater conflict. Historians predict various dates from 12 March to 19 April. He has born as the second son to Ponnumadan - Veyilal couple.

The parents and the villagers witnessed some spiritual significance in the face of the child. A naming ceremony was conducted and the name Mudisoodum Perumal (Lord Vishnu with Crown) was suggested by the elders and was accepted by others. Since people of lower castes are not allowed to use the names of God or Rulers the upper classes opposed the move and demanded an immediate name change.Fearing the oppression the child was renamed Muthukutty. There are various accounts as to who suggested the name. While few historians claim that the name Muthukutty, which tones prosaical, was suggested by the officials, others argued that though some officials from the administration were against the name  ‘Mudisoodum Perumal’ , they never suggested this alternative. There is another account that while the parents was seeking admission to the child for schooling in a traditional Schools known as Thinnai Palli the teacher refused to enrol the child with the name and he himself changed the name to Muthukutty. Another narration is that the King of Travancore, through his Umbrella bearer, Poovandar, directly ordered to change the name which includes the suffix ‘Perumal’ (Vishnu) to Muthukutty.  Other accounts speculates that the villagers themselves adopted the name as per the existing norms as the lower castes of the Travancore has to use differential language and different set of names to signify their differential social status from the upper classes.

Though he disliked rituals and practices  he was very religious  and prefers simple worship.  He was also very revolutionary in his thoughts, idea and acts right from his childhood.  He was a staunch devotee of Lord Vishnu as he had set a pedestal and offers regular prayers for Vishnu at his residence. He  use to meditate regularly during evenings at Marunthuvazh Malai. He well versed in various ancient arts including martial arts,  he appears as a multifaceted personality.  He was also said to be a very good orator.  Though it is not clear whether he advocated a unified society and supported intermingling of various castes and promoted inter-caste marriages. But he strongly propagated for a society totally free from caste discrimination and also worked for the betterment of the downtrodden.  He was intensely against the oppressive treatment of the lower classes.

Transformation

At the age of 17 he married  a woman Thirumalammal of Puviyoor, Agastheeswaram, who was left alone by her husband. There is also a view that they never get married and that the women only came to serve him in his activities . He continued his early life as a Palmyra Climber  and as an Agricultural labourer.  At the age of 22 he fall ill.

There is another narrative that at his age of 16,  the upper classes, being irritated by the inclusionary views and activities of Vaikundar and his popularity, made several attempts to eliminate him and all of them failed. So they eventually conspired to kill him in by clandestine means.   They pretend to be get convinced to his view and pretend to celebrate him and his preachings. They invited him for a banquet at Marunthuvazh Malai. He was served with poison through food. To every bodies wonder he remained unaffected.  But that the poison made some effects on him gradually and that the illness is due to the effects of the poison. The severity of illness increased as days passed on. Gradually he was reduced to the bed. He suffered acute pain for more than a year. The whole village was anxious over the suffering of Vaikundar.

The days passed and Vaikundar attained the age of 24. Veyilal, the mother informed that she was instructed by Lord Vishnu that his son will be cured off the illness if he was brought to the festival at Tiruchendur on the 19th of Masi 1008 M.E. The villagers along with his kith and kin began the journey carrying Vaikundar in the cradle to Tiruchendur in the late hours of 15th Masi 1008. M.E. It is vividly clear that Veyilal, the mother of Vaikundar accompanied him. But very few accounts suggest that Thirumalammal and Ponnu Madan is along with him during his journey. Authors Krishna Nathan and Kasi Udhayam made claims that the father and wife of Vaikundar were with Vaikundar on his way to Tiruchendur. 
On the way they took rest alongside a village well after having their meals. Wondering everybody, Vaikundar, who was until then could not set his foot on the ground, suddenly stepped out of the cradle and started walking swiftly and everybody else followed him. They believed that the dream of Veyilal is coming true. They reached Tiruchendur on 19th Masi 1008 M.E. and took part in the Masi festival at Tiruchendur.

The events surrounding the passage of Vaikundar towards the sea is a matter of conflict. On account propound that, during the late night while everybody except Veyilal were sleeping Vaikundar began walking swiftly towards the sea. Veyilal started to run screaming behind him. The relatives arose and they started running behind Veyilal up to the sea shore and that all of them witness the disappearance of Vaikundar into the sea.  Another narrative is that while they are taking a holy dip in the sea they found Vaikundar missing among the crowd and was not traced. Other authors opined that he was carried away by a massive wave on 1 March. Hours afterwards, with no signs of Vaikundar being found anywhere there, everybody else started convincing Veyilal in one way or another to return home. Highly distressed Veyilal decided not to go home without her son and remained weeping on the sea-shore.

After three days on 20th Masi 1008. M.E., the face of Vaikundar was seen rising over the horizon in the early morning hours. Writer Ponnu suggests that Vaikundar took his rebirth during the auspicious occasion of the Mahamaham, suggesting the date of the event on 5 March 1833. Few authors suggest that the relatives also witnessed the event while others maintain that all others except Veyilal went disappointed and that she alone was at the sea-shore after three days. The mother was very much excited to see Vaikundar back. However, the words of Vaikundar, after his advent from the sea shocked her as he proclaimed that he is no longer her son. He also revealed that, “Until the year ‘One thousand and Eight’ you were known to be my mother and now I had born as the son of Narayana for fulfilling the needs of Santror and to rule them forever.”

Penance

After making the proclamations, Vaikundar proceeded towards Kanyakumari. There he instructed the people to give-up the rituals and religious ceremonies  and reached Poovandanthope . It appears that few incidents in which he was ill-treated happened on the way. On the other hand he was also warmly welcomed at some places. He was also said to have performed miracles at various places through the way  As per writer Amalan, Vaikundar stayed at Udangudi on Masi 21 and reached Poovandanthoppe on 22 Masi 1008 M.E. . The news about the Thiruchendur incident spread all around the Villages nearby. After this incident people started calling him devoutly as ‘Ayya’  means Father in Tamil. He also travelled northwards to various parts of Tirunelveli to reveal his arrival. He travelled northwards up to Kadambankulam, through Pillaiyar Kudiyiruppu, Avaraikulam, Vadakkankulam, and Pambankulam.  At Kadambankulam, the northernmost venue to which Vaikundar travelled, today stands one among the  rare Nizhal Thangals which face geographic north. Vaikundar selected five Seedars. Two among them, Dharma Seedar and Bheeman Seedar were selected before his northwards travel, Arjunan Seedar was identified during the travel while the remaining two of them, Sahadevan Seedar, and Nakulan Seedar were selected after the travel.   Though Arjunan Seedar was identified earlier he was selected only afterwards. The episode of his northwards travel was documented  in very few sources.

After concluding his travel he returned to Swamithope by December 1833  and commenced his penance  by mid January 1834  during the auspicious month of Margazhi. It consists of three phases. The first phase of his penance last for two years from January 1843 to December 1835.  The Phase I is named Yuga Thavasu and was intended to abolish the rule of the evil force, Kali and for the subsequent end of Kali Yuga.  The Yuga Thavasu is performed in a standing posture  within a 6 feet-deep pit.  During this phase he use to talk less and believed to have taken no food.  The second Phase is dedicated for the elimination of the case based and other discriminations among human communities and for the upliftment of Santror.  The second phase too lasted for two years beginning on December 1835 till December 1837.  This phase is performed at the ground level in a sitting posture.  He took only rice gruel . However, some sources claimed that he took milk and fruits during Phase II .

Phase III of the penance began by January 1838.   This last phase is meant for the upliftment of women and for the betterment of his progeny.  Phase III is performed by him on a raised pedestal.  The last phase too was intended to extend for two complete years but was interrupted by the King of Travancore.

Mendicant

By this time it is believed that so many miracles began to happen around him and people started believing his as their saviour.  The news began to spread like wild-fire and thousands of people from every section of the society  from the surrounding villages began to visit Swamithope, believing that their grievances be addressed by him.  He is believed to have cured various diseases during this period.  People witnessed mysterious experience and influence while standing before him  Some accounts suggests that attempts were made by the upper classes during this time to dispel his popularity.  During this time he also believed to have incinerated the demons and also seized the power of the witchcraft, sorcery etc in front of his devotees.

Vaikundar characterised himself as a Mendicant. He was addressed by the worshippers as ‘Narayana Pandaram’.  It was during these days he preached several revolutionary ideas which are considered as historically unparalleled. He emphasized the importance of Charity, Truth and love and induced these values into the rituals.  Most of his teachings and rituals he advocated has both religious and social implications. Historically, the rituals were used or viewed as an attempt to break the inequalities, mainly caste-based, prevailed in the society of the time, and to strengthen and uplift the sociologically downtrodden and ill-treated. Examples of this include the charity on food as 'Anna Dharmam' , physical as well as spiritual cleanliness through Thuvayal Thavasu, eliminating untouchability through Thottunamam, self-respect and courage through headgear, and unifying various castes through Muthirikkinaru. His revolutionary doctrine caused great excitement among the people and prepared them to fight for their rights. (SFSE 48)   During this time he also believed to have incinerated the demons and also seized the power of the witchcraft, sorcery etc. in front of his devotees.

Arrest 

The teachings of Vaikundar created an excitement among the people and it began to reflect in the socio-religious arena of the 19th century South Travancore and South Tirunelveli. The lower classes began to resist several oppressions all of them until then remained unchallenged. The upper classes viewed this as a challenge against them as they believed that the collapse of the existing system may undermine their social status seriously. Numerous complaints were made before the King of Travancore by the upper classes against Vaikundar and his activities.  But the king seems to ignore all of them initially.  The issue was brought before the king Swathi Thirunal Rama Varma once again during his Suchindrum visit.  Being a staunch believer of the Varna system, it seems hard for the King to believe Vaikundar, whose community was outside the caste-fold, to be the avatar of Narayana.  Moreover, the claim made by Vaikundar that himself will rule the world as an undisputed King misled the king. He suspected that Vaikundar was provoking the people and was plotting for a revolt against the Kingdom.  Fearing a revolution he sent the armed forces immediately to arrest Vaikundar    The large gathering around Vaikundar confronted with the army. Vaikundar refrained them from getting violent  and appealed them to pave the way for the forces.  The soldiers arrested him and took him to Suchindrum. 

At Suchindrum, Vaikundar was brought in front of the king. He, who already had doubts about the divinity of Vaikundar, intended to test his supernatural ability  by hiding his ring in his hand and asking him to name it.  Vaikundar preferred not to answer and to remain silent  The king ordered his imprisonment immediately  He was imprisoned in a confinement filled with sewage infested with worms  It is also noted by some that he was asked to take alcohol in which various poisonous herbs  was mixed up. Miraculously Vaikundar remained unaffected  He was imprisoned there for two days. Then the king ordered him to be taken to Thiruvananthapuram, the capital of Travancore. The forces proceed towards Thiruvananthapuram through Kottar, Parvathipuram, Chungankadai and reached Thuckalay. That night he was kept imprisoned at Manalikkara . The next day the soldiers took him to Thiruvananthapuram via Balaramapuram. At Thiruvananthapuram, Vaikundar was jailed at Singarathope open prison.  Jubliant followers of Vaikundar accompanied him all through his way and stayed at the prison premises 

During his imprisonment period people in large numbers rushed to Singarathope to avail his blessings.  Vaikundar was subjected to several severe tribulations and cruel treatments. However, he continued preaching and healing there too.  He also said to have performed various miracles at the prison  Attempts were also made to burn him in lime kiln and in Chilli go-down. He had overcome all these miraculously.  He was finally thrown into the cage of a hungry Tiger in front of the administrators, army staff and public. Contrary to the expectation of the officials the tiger did not jump onto its prey. One of the soldiers tried to prod it with a spear in order to provoke it.  The tiger caught hold of the spear and in no time left it abruptly when the other end of the spear ripped the abdomen of a priest and he died on the spot. This event shocked the king as he believed that killing a priest would fetch divine wrath. He ordered the release of Vaikundar immediately upon the condition that he would restrict his activities and preaching only to his caste. Vaikundar not only refused to sign the condition but also refused to accept his release. He tore the royal writ into pieces since his mission was the betterment and equality of all castes. He proclaimed that he would be accepting the release only after the completion imprisonment period.

He remained in jail as a prisoner for the full 3 ¾ months. He was released after 110 days, in the first week of March. These events enhanced the fame of Vaikundar further all over the kingdom.  His followers carried him back as a procession and they reached Poovandanthope on 19 Masi 1013 M.E (1 March 1838), a day before the 5th anniversary of his incarnation.

Later life

As the Phase III of his Tavam was disrupted by the King he decided to fulfil the penance. He also directed 700 families to undertake Thuvayal Thavasu, the Washing Penance. They concluded the penance at two Phases. Phase I last for 6 months and was conducted at Vakaippathi and Phase II lasts another 6 months at Muttapathi.  By the same time the final phase of Tavam of Vaikundar too completed at Poovandanthope.  After the conclusion of the Tavam he consecrated the Muthirikkinaru, historically the first ever well in South India which was allowed to be used by all castes. He was also believed to be received the Second Vinchai from Lord Narayana at Theerthakkarai, Muttapathi. Then he moved westwards to the place which was now known to be as Ambala Pathi.

At Ambalappathi, he portrayed himself as a reigning King under a grand roof similar to the ones in the then Travancore palace.  He was also believed to have unified various deighties into himself there by conducting a grand ceremony, Ikanai manam. . Afterwards he also laid foundation stones for several Nizhal Thangals throughout South Travancore and South Tirunelvely.  He breathed his last in 21 Vaikasi 1026.M.E His  ‘Sacred Golden Body’  was interned at Poovandanthope which was now the Palliyarai of Swamithope Pathi.

References
 
 G. Patrick (2003), Religion and Subaltern Agency, Department of Christian Studies, University of Madras, Chennai.
 T. Krishnanathan (2000), Ayya Vaikundarin Vazhvum Sinthanaiyum, Madurai Kamaraj University, Thinai Publications, Nagercoil.
 C. Paulose (2002), Advaita Philosophy of Brahmasri Chattampi Swamikal, Sree Sankaracharya University of Sanskrit, Ayya Vaikunta Nather Sidhasramam, Pothaiyadi.
 R. Ponnu (2000), Sri Vaikunda Swamigal and Struggle for Social Equality in South India, Madurai Kamaraj University, Ram Publishers, Madurai.
 R. Ponnu (2002), Vaikunda Swamikal Ore Avataram, Ram Publishers, Madurai.
 R. Shunmugam (2001), Nadar Kulathil Narayanar Avataram, Nadar Kuladeepam Publications, Karankadu.
 Samuel Mateer (1871), The Land of charity: a descriptive account of Travancore and its people, Asian Educational Services, 
 V.T. Chellam (2002), Thamizaka Varalarum Panpadum (The History and Culture of Tamil Nadu), Manickavasakar Publications, Chennai.
 Madanjeet Singh (2005), The Sasia Story, France, .
 P. Sundaram Swamigal and K. Ponnumani (2001), Ayyavaikundanathar Jeevacharithram (Biography of Ayya Vaikunta Nathar), Ayyavaikuntanathar Siddasramam Publications, Pothaiyadi.
 V. Nagam Aiya (1989), The Travancore State Manual, Volume-2, Asian Educational Services, .
 P. Sarvesvaran, Sri Vaikunda Swamikal – A Forgotten Social Reformer.
 N. Amalan (2000), Ayya Vaikundar Punitha Varalaru, Akilam Publications, Swamithoppu.
 Samuel Zecharia (1897), The London Missionary Society in South Travancore 1805–1855, LMS Press, Nagercoil.
 M. S. S. Pandiyan (1992)  Meanings of 'colonialism' and 'nationalism''': an essay on Vaikunda Swamy cult, Sage Publications
 A. Sreedhara Menon (1967), A Survey of Kerala History, D.C. Books, Kottayam, 
 Dr. M. Immanuel (2007), Kanniyakumari: Aspects and Architects'', Historical Research & Publications Trust, Nagercoil,

Citations

Ayya Vaikundar